The 9th British Empire Trophy was a Formula One motor race held on 21 August 1947 at the Douglas Circuit, in Douglas, Isle of Man. The 40 lap race was won by Bob Gerard in an  ERA B-Type, setting fastest lap in the process. Peter Whitehead finished second in another B-Type, and Bob Ansell was third in a Maserati 4CL. B. Bira started from pole position in his Maserati 4CL and finished fifth.

Results

References

External links

British Empire Trophy
British Empire Trophy
Brit
1947 in the Isle of Man